Edward Karol Jankowski (9 January 1930 — 19 March 1987) was a Polish footballer who played as a forward.

Born in Bogucice, he played for clubs including Gwardia Warsaw, Legia Warsaw, Górnik Radlin, Górnik Zabrze, Maribymong Polonia and ROW Rybnik.

Jankowski made his international debut for Poland on 25 May 1952 in a 1–0 friendly loss away to Romania, going on to total ten caps and four goals. All of these goals came in fixtures against Finland in 1958 FIFA World Cup qualification: a hat-trick in a 3–1 win in Helsinki on 5 July 1957, and one in a 4–0 victory in Warsaw on 3 November.

References

1930 births
1987 deaths
Sportspeople from Silesian Voivodeship
Polish footballers
Association football forwards
Gwardia Warsaw players
Legia Warsaw players
Górnik Zabrze players
Western Eagles FC players
Polish expatriate footballers
Expatriate soccer players in Australia
Polish expatriate sportspeople in Australia
Poland international footballers
Sportspeople from Katowice